Jeremy Moon is a New Zealand businessman and entrepreneur who founded the clothing manufacturer Icebreaker in 1995. Moon used $25,000 to found the business, making garments from New Zealand merino wool.

Icebreaker was purchased by VF Corporation, a NYSE-listed entity, in 2018 for NZ$288 million. Moon received NZ$95 million from the sale.

Moon was made a Member of the New Zealand Order of Merit in 2008 for services to business.

References 

New Zealand businesspeople
Living people
1969 births